Cytherea is a genus of bee flies (flies in the family Bombyliidae).

Species 
Cytherea adumbrata Paramonov, 1930
Cytherea angusta Paramonov, 1930
Cytherea araxana Paramonov, 1930
Cytherea arenicola Paramonov, 1930
Cytherea aurea Fabricius, 1794
Cytherea barbara Sack, 1906
Cytherea bucharensis Paramonov, 1930
Cytherea cinerea Fabricius, 1805
Cytherea deserticola Paramonov, 1930
Cytherea dichroma Paramonov, 1930
Cytherea discipes Becker, 1915
Cytherea disparoides Paramonov, 1930
Cytherea dubia Macquart, 1846
Cytherea elegans Paramonov, 1930
Cytherea esfandarii Lindner, 1979
Cytherea esfandiarii Lindner, 1975
Cytherea fasciata Fabricius, 1805
Cytherea fusciventris Zaitzev, 1966
Cytherea innitidifrons Abbassian-Lintzen, 1968
Cytherea iranica Abbassian-Lintzen, 1968
Cytherea lateralis Rondani, 1868
Cytherea latifrons Paramonov, 1930
Cytherea lyncharribalzagai Evenhuis, 1978
Cytherea marginalis Rondani, 1868
Cytherea mervensis Paramonov, 1927
Cytherea obscura Fabricius, 1794
Cytherea pallidifrons Evenhuis, 1978
Cytherea pallidipennis Abbassian-Lintzen, 1968
Cytherea pamirensis Paramonov, 1930
Cytherea Paramonov Evenhuis, 1999
Cytherea rungsi Timon-David, 1952
Cytherea setosa Paramonov, 1930
Cytherea turanica Paramonov, 1930
Cytherea turkestanica Paramonov, 1930
Cytherea turkmenica Paramonov, 1930
Cytherea wadensis Efflatoun, 1945

References

External links 

 

Bombyliidae
Asiloidea genera
Taxa named by Johan Christian Fabricius